New Generation Software was a firm best known for the computer games with innovative graphics it produced for the Sinclair ZX81 and ZX Spectrum computers. It was conceived in the spring of 1982 shortly after the lead developer, Malcolm Evans created 3D Monster Maze (initially released by J. K. Greye Software, and later republished by New Generation Software)—one of the first 3D games for a home computer.

Company history
New Generation was started by the aforementioned Malcolm Evans, for whom the company was his first professional experience in software or games - he had previously been in computer hardware. The other core members of the team were teenagers Paul Bunn and James Day, sixteen and nineteen years old in 1984.  The company released games from 1982 to 1986.  By 2005, copyright to New Generation Software games was held by Titus Games.

Games released
3D Monster Maze, 1982
3D Tunnel, 1983
Amazon Warrior, 1985
Cliff Hanger, 1984
Corridors of Genon, 1983
The Custard Kid, 1985
Escape, 1982
Jonah Barrington's Squash, 1985
Knot in 3D, 1983
Trashman, 1984
Travel With Trashman, 1984

Other software
The Complete Machine Code Tutor, 1984
Light Magic, 1985

References

External links
NGS World — A tribute homepage of the New Generation Software titles, created and maintained by Malcolm's daughter Rachel

Defunct video game companies of the United Kingdom
British companies established in 1982
Video game companies established in 1982
Video game companies disestablished in 1986